HMS Elizabeth was a 74-gun third rate ship of the line of the Royal Navy, launched on 17 October 1769 at Portsmouth Dockyard.

In 1778 James Bisset served on the ship as a newly commissioned lieutenant under Captain Frederick Maitland. Maitland had married Bisset's first cousin, Margaret Louisa Dick of Edinburgh.

She was broken up in 1797.

Citations and notes

References

Lavery, Brian (2003) The Ship of the Line - Volume 1: The development of the battlefleet 1650-1850. Conway Maritime Press. .

External links
 

Ships built in Portsmouth
Elizabeth-class ships of the line
1769 ships